Liobagrus formosanus is a species of catfish in the family Amblycipitidae (the torrent catfishes). It is endemic to Taiwan. This species reaches a maximum length of  standard length.

References

External links 
 

Liobagrus
Freshwater fish of Taiwan
Endemic fauna of Taiwan
Fish described in 1908
Taxa named by Charles Tate Regan